"Mr. Wendal" is a song by American rap group Arrested Development from their debut album, 3 Years, 5 Months and 2 Days in the Life Of... (1992). In Europe and Australia, it was issued as a double A-side with their following single, "Revolution." In the United States, the song peaked at number six on the Billboard Hot 100, selling 500,000 copies and earning a gold certification. Worldwide, it reached the top 10 in Australia, Ireland, New Zealand, and the United Kingdom.

Content
The song was written about the plight of the homeless and encourages people not to ignore them just because of their status or how they look, but instead to learn from their non-materialistic lifestyles.

Critical reception
Larry Flick from Billboard described "Mr. Wendal" as "another gem". He added, "Once again, lyrics that realistically reflect the strife and struggle of survival during these racially tense times are woven into an easy-going pop/hip hop groove. Icing on the cake are rich and soulful vocals at the chorus." Dave Sholin from the Gavin Report found that the song is "entertaining, thought-provoking and cutting-edge". British magazine Music Week stated that the follow up to "People Everyday" is "a wordy, worthy successor", adding "there's no familiar tune to latch on to this time, just a doodling instrumental in which they leave — for a rap groove, at least — some sizable gaps, giving the track room to breathe." The magazine also wrote that the song "will be a considerable hit." Angus Batey from NME felt it "is spoilt by being an exact copy" of De La Soul's "Eye Know". Mark Sutherland from Smash Hits gave it five out of five and named it Best New Single, calling it a "deliciously laidback rap number".

Music video
The song's accompanying music video was directed by Keith Ward. It was nominated in the category for Best R&B Music Video at the 1994 Soul Train Music Awards.

Charts

Weekly charts

Year-end charts

Certifications

In popular culture
 This song was played during the first-season finale episode of the American primetime television soap opera Melrose Place on May 26, 1993.
 In 1993 Kids Incorporated covered "Mr. Wendal" in the Season 9 episode "One Man Band".

References

External links
 

1992 singles
1992 songs
Arrested Development (group) songs
Chrysalis Records singles
EMI Records singles
Songs about homelessness
Songs about poverty
Songs written by Sly Stone
Songs written by Donald Fagen
Songs written by Walter Becker